Erythrolamprus maryellenae, Maryellen's ground snake, is a species of snake in the family Colubridae. The species is found in Brazil.

References

Erythrolamprus
Reptiles of Brazil
Endemic fauna of Brazil
Reptiles described in 1985
Taxa named by James R. Dixon